Eldar Assanov (born August 22, 1974) is a former competitor in Freestyle wrestling for Ukraine. His major accomplishment was a silver medal in the 1997 World Wrestling Championships.

He also won a bronze medal at the 1995 World Military Games, and again at the 1999 World Military Games. He was a world champion at the espoir level in 1993, European champion at the junior level in 1991, and European champion at the espoir level in 1994.

References

1974 births
Living people
Ukrainian male sport wrestlers
World Wrestling Championships medalists
20th-century Ukrainian people